was a town located in Shimohei District, Iwate Prefecture in Japan. Today it is part of the city of Miyako.

History
The village of Tarō was created on April 1, 1889, within Higashihei District with the establishment of the municipality system. Higashihei merged with the Kitahei and Nakahei Districts to form Shimohei District on March 29, 1896. Tarō was raised to town status on April 1, 1944.

On June 6, 2005, Tarō, along with the village of Niisato (also from Shimohei District), merged into the expanded city of Miyako and no longer exists as an independent municipality.

In June 2005, the town had an estimated population of 4,679 and a population density of 46.3 persons per km2. The total area was 101.05 km2.

The former town is located to the east of the prefectural capital Morioka and north of the regional center Miyako with which it has now merged. The area has a rugged coastline to the east, which is a part of Sanriku ria Coast. The main local industry is commercial fishing. 

The town had been destroyed a number of times due to tsunami incidents all throughout its history. One of the earliest recorded was in 1611, but was later followed by similar tsunamis in 1896 (with 1,859 recorded deaths) and 1933 (with 911 recorded deaths). Due to its history of repeated destruction by tsunamis, two layers of seawalls in the form of an X-shaped structure were constructed. It was known as a Banri no Chojo: Japanese for "Great Wall of China."

Local municipal agencies regularly carried out annual tsunami drills simulating an emergency, wherein volunteers would close the seawall gates and residents would go to muster points above the town. The system worked well when a tsunami from the 1960 Valdivia earthquake in Chile struck the town, resulting in zero lives lost in Tarō.

2011 Tōhoku earthquake and tsunami 
Survivors said they saw some residents climb onto the sea defenses to watch the approaching tsunami only to be swept away when the waves went over the wall. Many in the town said they felt the wall lulled them into a false sense of security. A  section of the seaside wall was swept away by the tsunami. Large amounts of concrete debris was left around Tarō and scattered in its bay.  181 people were dead or missing in the tsunami, with nearly 1,700 houses damaged or destroyed.

Four years after the tsunami, on 22 November 2015, a "town opening" ceremony was held in Tarō after the completion of 450 new houses. The new houses were built on higher ground some 40 to 60 meters above the sea level, as well as on ground that had been raised by about 2 meters. A few years later, an added 14.7-metre seawall was rebuilt in 2017.  Even with these added precautions, the population of the town suffered, dropping  dropped to 3,173, which is around 70 percent of its total population in 2011.

References

External links
 Official website of Miyako 
 Tarō sea wall before and after the tsunami by NHK
 Aerial views showing the extent of Tarō's coastal defences before March 2011
 Computer graphic showing the effects of the tsunami on Tarō.

Dissolved municipalities of Iwate Prefecture
Miyako, Iwate